Lone Star State of Mind was the fifth studio album released by Nanci Griffith, and her first album for MCA Records. Griffith's music took a turn from her original folk music base into more commercially viable country music. For this album, she enlisted the talents of veteran country producer Tony Brown. The album garnered her first appearance on the Billboard Country charts, rising to #23 on the Country Albums chart, and was her highest charting album. The title track, "Lone Star State of Mind," became the first of only three Griffith singles to enter the Top 40 of the Billboard Hot Country Singles chart. It peaked at #36, while two other singles from the album, "Cold Hearts/Closed Minds" and "Trouble in the Fields", reached #64 and #57 respectively. "From a Distance" failed to chart because it was released only as a promotional single in the USA. That song successfully hit the charts when Bette Midler covered it in 1990.

Critical reception

Thom Owens of AllMusic wrote of the album, "Lone Star State of Mind was Nanci Griffith's commercial breakthrough, largely because it was her first step directly toward mainstream contemporary country."

This album was given a mark of "B" by Robert Christgau in his review. He wrote, "Band's the same, and there's not a whole hell of a lot of distance between Jim Rooney, a marketwise old folk pro, and Tony Brown" and concludes with, "Too often, though, she's still a folkie playing just folks."

Dedication to Rosalie Sorrels
The song "Ford Econline" was a fictional tale dedicated to folk singer Rosalie Sorrels. In the song, Griffith describes Sorrels escaping an unhappy Mormon marriage, driving from Salt Lake City to San Diego with her five children to start a new life as a folk singer. Sorrels and her husband were not Mormon but Sorrels certainly did drive her children around the US in a Ford Econoline passenger van as she toured and sang. The "rollicking" song was not released as a single, but it was performed frequently by Griffith in concert, including a standout appearance backed by the Chieftains and Roger Daltrey in Belfast in 1991, part of the finale sequence on the live album An Irish Evening.

Track listing

Personnel
Nanci Griffith - acoustic guitar, harmony vocals
Pat Alger - acoustic lead guitar, hi-string guitar
John Catchings - cello
Philip Donnelly - acoustic guitar, electric guitar
Béla Fleck - banjo
Emory Gordy Jr. - electric bass and mandolin on "Sing One for Sister"
Lloyd Green - dobro, pedal steel
Roy Huskey Jr. - upright bass on "Sing One for Sister"
John Barlow Jarvis - piano
Lucy Kaplansky - harmony vocals
Russ Kunkel - drums, percussion
Mac McAnally - acoustic guitar, harmony vocals
Mark O'Connor - fiddle, mandolin, mandola, viola, violin, acoustic guitar on "From a Distance"
Rick West - acoustic lead guitar on "There's a Light Beyond These Woods" and "Trouble in the Fields"

Production

Producer - Tony Brown
Producer - Nanci Griffith
Recorder and Mixer - Steve Tillisch
Second Engineers - Mark J. Coddington, Tim Kish, Russ Marting, Marty Williams
Project Coordinator - Jessie Noble
CD Art Direction - Simon Levy
CD Design - Camille Engel Advertising
CD Coordinator - Katie Gillon, Sherri Halford
Photography - McGuire

Track information and credits adapted from the album's liner notes.

Chart performance

References 

Nanci Griffith albums
1987 albums
Albums produced by Tony Brown (record producer)
MCA Records albums